The list of ship commissionings in 1950 includes a chronological list of all ships commissioned in 1950.


See also 

1950
 Ship commissionings